The 1969 Minnesota Golden Gophers football team represented the University of Minnesota in the 1969 Big Ten Conference football season. In their 16th year under head coach Murray Warmath, the Golden Gophers compiled a 6–4 record and outscored their opponents by a combined total of 207 to 190.
 
End Ray Paron received the team's Most Valuable Player award. Parson was also named All-Big Ten first team. Linebacker Noel Jenke, halfback Barry Mayer and defensive lineman Leon Trawick were named Academic All-Big Ten. The team included offensive lineman, Richard Fliehr, better known as professional wrestler Ric Flair.

Total attendance at six home games was 272,449, an average of 45,417 per game. The largest crowd was against Ohio State.

Schedule

Roster

References

Minnesota
Minnesota Golden Gophers football seasons
Minnesota Golden Gophers football